Landing platform helicopter (LPH) is a term used by some navies to denote a type of amphibious warfare ship designed primarily to operate as a launch and recovery platform for helicopters and other VTOL aircraft. As such, they are considered a type of helicopter carrier.

Under the NATO Standardization Agreement (STANAG) document for reporting vessels, LPH is a short form designator used for "Amphibious Assault Ship, Helicopter" defined as a "large helicopter carrier" for carrying and deploying around 1,800 assault troops using its own aircraft, but for which use of landing craft is "not a principal function". For ships of this hull classification in the Royal Navy, LPH is a direct acronym for "Landing Platform Helicopter", while the United States Navy referred to its vessels within this classification as "Landing ship, Personnel, Helicopter", and after 2006 as "amphibious assault ships". The etymology is L for amphibious, P for transport, and H for helicopter. Regardless of the terminology, all vessels classified as an LPH possess essentially similar capabilities.

The Royal Navy also used the term "Commando Carrier", which it applied to aircraft carriers converted to helicopter only operations. Prior to selling the vessel to the Brazilian Navy in 2018, the RN operated  as an LPH. Following the British government's decision to withdraw its Harrier aircraft at the end of 2010, the former light fleet carrier  also performed this role until decommissioning in 2014.

No ships of this classification are currently in active service with the U.S. Navy, having been replaced with multi-purpose ships classified under NATO naming conventions as landing helicopter dock or landing helicopter assault ships.

Ships classified as LPH

Brazilian Navy 
  (ex HMS Ocean (L12))

Republic of Korea Navy

Royal Navy 

Royal Navy "Commando Carriers" and "Amphibious Helicopter Carriers"
  – 1956 only, emergency minimal conversion for Suez Crisis  - Broken up
  – 1956 only, emergency minimal conversion for Suez Crisis Colossus-class. Placed into reserve until broken up in 1962
  – 1962-1972, converted  - Converted to a Commando carrier in 1961/62. Decommissioned 1972 and scrapped.
  – 1960-1980, converted Centaur-class. Converted to an anti-submarine warfare carrier 1979. Kept in service until HMS Invincible entered service. Due to accumulated damage she was not fit for emergency use in the Falklands War and was later broken up.
  – 1973-1976, Centaur-class aircraft carrier converted for amphibious operations, then in 1976 as a helicopter anti-submarine warfare carrier and later still as a BAe Sea Harrier-equipped VSTOL light carrier. During the Falklands operated helicopters for both anti-submarine and troop movements Sold to the Indian Navy, as the INS Viraat.
  – 1998-2018 designed and built as a commando carrier based on the Invincible-class STOVL carrier hull. Decommissioned in March 2018 sold to Brazil, who renamed it Atlântico.
  - 2011-2014,  equipped and re-purposed as a commando carrier while HMS Ocean was in refit. Decommissioned in 2014 and scrapped in Turkey.

United States Navy 

 USS Block Island (LPH-1) (formerly CVE-106) –  – Conversion to LPH cancelled -Scrapped
  –  – First ship to be designed and built from the keel up as an amphibious assault ship - Scrapped
  – Iwo Jima-class - Sunk in SINKEX
 USS Boxer (LPH-4) (ex CV-21) – converted straight deck  - Scrapped
 USS  Princeton (LPH-5) (ex CV-37) – converted straight deck Essex-class aircraft carrier - Scrapped
 USS Thetis Bay (LPH-6) (ex CVE-90, ex CVHA-1) – converted  - Scrapped
  – Iwo Jima-class - Sunk in SINKEX
 USS Valley Forge (LPH-8) (ex CV-45) – converted straight deck Essex-class aircraft carrier - Scrapped
  – Iwo Jima-class - Sunk in SINKEX
  – Iwo Jima-class – Scrapped
  – Iwo Jima-class - Sunk in SINKEX off of the coast of Oahu, Hawaii.
  – Iwo Jima-class - Stricken from the list and sunk east of Virginia Beach, Virginia on 5 December 2004.

See also 
 Amphibious assault ship
 Helicopter carrier
 List of amphibious warfare ships
 List of United States Navy amphibious warfare ships § Landing Platform Helicopter (LPH)

References 

Amphibious warfare vessels
Helicopter carriers
Ships of the United States Navy